This is a list of statistics and records of the Champions League Twenty20, a Twenty20 cricket competition.

Team records

Results summary

The table below provides an overview of the performances of teams over past editions of the Champions League Twenty20. League and group stages are considered equivalent.

Note: List includes qualifier results also.
 Tie+W and Tie+L indicates matches tied and then won or lost by "Super Over"
 Apprd = No. of times teams participated in the tournament
 The above table is sorted by no. of matches, then no. of wins, less no. of defeats, win%, no. of appearances and then by alphabetical order

Source: Results Summary

Highest totals

Full Table on Cricinfo

Lowest totals

Full Table on Cricinfo

Batting Records

Most runs

Full Table on Cricinfo

Highest individual score

Full Table on Cricinfo

Most sixes

Full Table on Cricinfo

Most Fifties 

Full Table on Cricinfo

Most hundreds

Note: Team in brackets represents for which the batsman scored century

Full Table on Cricinfo

Best strike rates

Minimum 100 balls faced

Full Table on Cricinfo

Highest averages

Minimum of 10 innings
Full Table on Cricinfo

Bowling Records

Most wickets

Full Table on Cricinfo

Best bowling figures in an innings

Full Table on Cricinfo

Best economy rates
Minimum 10 overs bowled

Full Table on Cricinfo

Hat-tricks

Wicketkeeping and Fielding records

Most dismissals

Full Table on Cricinfo

Most catches (fielder)

Full Table on Cricinfo

Miscellaneous records

External links
 Champions League Twenty20 records on ESPN CricInfo

References

records and statistics
Cricket records and statistics
Champions League Twenty20 records and statistics